Vincent L. Sadusky is the Chief Executive Officer at IGT. He previously served as CEO & President of Media General ahead of its sale to Nexstar Media Group. Previously, he served as the President, Chief Executive Officer and CFO of LIN Media. He also served as the Director of International Game Technology. He holds a BS degree from Pennsylvania State University and an MBA from New York Institute Of Technology.

References

Living people
New York Institute of Technology alumni
American chief executives
Pennsylvania State University alumni
Year of birth missing (living people)